Kathleen Carey is a health economist and Professor in the Department of Health Law, Policy and Management at the Boston University School of Public Health.  As a member of the Massachusetts Public Health Council, "she holds the governor-appointed seat representing the Massachusetts Coalition for the Prevention of Medical Errors." She began her six year term in December 2019.

Education
Boston University, PhD Economics
Harvard University, MAT Education
Le Moyne College, BS Mathematics

Publications
Carey, K., Dor, A. (2008). Expense preference behavior and management “outsourcing”: A comparison of adopters and non-adopters of contract management in U.S. hospitals. Journal of Productivity Analysis, 29(1), 61-75.
Medicare's Hospital Compare quality reports appear to have slowed price increases for two major procedures
Price Variations and Their Trends in U.S. Hospitals

References

Boston University School of Public Health faculty
Boston University alumni
Harvard Graduate School of Education alumni
Le Moyne College alumni
Year of birth missing (living people)
Living people
Place of birth missing (living people)
Nationality missing
Health economists